Familial male-limited precocious puberty, often abbreviated as FMPP, also known as familial sexual precocity or gonadotropin-independent testotoxicosis, is a form of gonadotropin-independent precocious puberty in which boys experience early onset and progression of puberty. Signs of puberty can develop as early as an age of 1 year.

The spinal length in boys may be short due to a rapid advance in epiphyseal maturation. It is an autosomal dominant condition with a mutation of the luteinizing hormone (LH) receptor. As FMPP is a gonadotropin-independent form of precocious puberty, gonadotropin-releasing hormone agonists (GnRH agonists) are ineffective. Treatment is with drugs that suppress or block the effects of gonadal steroidogenesis, such as cyproterone acetate, ketoconazole, spironolactone, and testolactone. Alternatively, the combination of the androgen receptor antagonist bicalutamide and the aromatase inhibitor anastrozole may be used.

Robert King Stone, personal physician to American president Abraham Lincoln, described the first case of FMPP in 1852.

See also
 Follicle-stimulating hormone insensitivity
 Gonadotropin-releasing hormone insensitivity
 Hypergonadism, hyperandrogenism, and precocious puberty
 Inborn errors of steroid metabolism
 Leydig cell hypoplasia (or LH insensitivity)

References

External links 
 

Autosomal dominant disorders
Congenital disorders
Gonadotropin-releasing hormone and gonadotropins
Rare diseases
Cell surface receptor deficiencies
Intersex variations